Caphys subrosealis is a species of snout moth in the genus Caphys. It was described by Francis Walker in 1866, and is known from Honduras.

References

Moths described in 1866
Chrysauginae